The London Film Critics Circle Award for Actress of the Year in an annual award given by the London Film Critics' Circle.

Winners
* : Winner of the Academy Award for Best Actress
¥ : Winner of the Academy Award for Best Supporting Actress

1990s

2000s

2010s

2020s

Multiple awards
3 awards
 Cate Blanchett
 Frances McDormand

2 awards
 Annette Bening
 Olivia Colman
 Nicole Kidman
 Julianne Moore
 Meryl Streep

References
 London Film Critics' Circle Awards - IMDb

Film awards for lead actress
A